Robert Dennis Curtis (25 January 1950 – 19 March 2010) was an English footballer who played as a right full back, most notably for Charlton Athletic. He also represented Mansfield Town and Kettering Town.

Bob was born in Langwith Whaley-Thorns in Nottinghamshire and was scouted by Charlton Athletic whilst playing as a striker for local side Shirebrook Town. He signed for Charlton in February 1967, and was given his chance in the first team after Billy Bonds had been sold to West Ham United.

Curtis represented Charlton Athletic for 12 seasons, and in that time, he made 337 league appearances for the Addicks, and scored 35 goals. He was famously once expelled from the England under-23 squad after he dyed his hair blonde, to make him look like his idol Bobby Moore.

After a disagreement with the Charlton management staff, Curtis was sold to Mansfield Town in his native East Midlands for an undisclosed fee in March 1978. During his time with the Stags, he made 73 league appearances for the club, and 87 in all competitions, scoring seven goals. An achilles injury forced him to retire from full-time football in 1980, and he subsequently played one season for non-league Kettering Town before hanging up his boots in 1981.

Curtis died in March 2010, aged 60, after a lengthy battle against motor neurone disease (known as Lou Gehrig's disease or ALS in North America).

References

1950 births
2010 deaths
English footballers
Charlton Athletic F.C. players
Mansfield Town F.C. players
Kettering Town F.C. players
Association football defenders
Neurological disease deaths in the United Kingdom
Deaths from motor neuron disease
English Football League players